GECOS or gecos may stand for:
General Electric Comprehensive Operating Supervisor (GECOS), which was later renamed to General Comprehensive Operating System (GCOS)
gecos field, an entry in the /etc/passwd file containing personal data about the user on Unix operating systems